John Jefferson Poland (July 12, 1942 – November 17, 2017) better known as John Fuck Poland was an activist, co-founder of the Sexual Freedom League, and convicted child molester.

Early life
Poland was born in Indiana in 1942. He became a student at Florida State University and majored in sociology. He was expelled from that university in 1960 for his integrationist work with the Congress for Racial Equality (CORE). He participated with the Freedom Riders in Florida and in June 1961 was one of the "Tallahassee Ten" who were arrested for unlawful assembly at a segregated airport restaurant. A year later, he was involved in Ban the Bomb activities.

Poland moved to California and worked as an agricultural labor organizer, renting a room in the home of Dolores Huerta. He worked with CORE to register black voters in Louisiana in the summer of 1963.

Poland participated in one of the first known LGBT rights demonstrations in the United States. Poland, along with organizer Randy Wicker and several others, picketed the Whitehall Induction Center in New York City to protest the US military's exclusion of homosexuals from military service and the violation of confidentiality of gay men's draft records. Sources differ on the date of this demonstration, with some citing 1963 and others 1964.

Sexual Freedom League

In 1963, Poland founded the Sexual Freedom League in New York City with Leo Koch. He then moved to the San Francisco Bay Area and focused his organizing efforts near the University of California, Berkeley and San Francisco State University. Poland founded various chapters, including ones in the East Bay, San Francisco, Berkeley and San Diego. However, he did not run these organizations himself; he would found them and then turn them over to others. Poland was a graduate student at San Francisco State University.

Poland, on August 25, 1965, conducted a "Nude Wade-in" he led with Ina Saslow and Shirley Einseidel at Aquatic Park, a public beach in San Francisco. This event was reported in the San Francisco Chronicle and Time.  At least one UPI photo of this event is archived at the Library of Congress.

Poland, calling himself "Jefferson Fuck Poland", had, in 1966, his name legally changed thereto and identifying as bisexual.

While at San Francisco State University, Poland with Blair Paltridge, were connected with a magazine called Open Process. They were suspended for printing and writing obscene material in the November 14, 1967, issue of the magazine.

Poland was a subject and contributor to the underground newspaper the Berkeley Barb.

In 1968, Poland signed the "Writers and Editors War Tax Protest" pledge, vowing to refuse tax payments in protest against the Vietnam War.

In May 1968, the Diggers theater group held an event they called the "Free City Convention," at the Fillmore West (then known as the Carousel Ballroom) when Poland held a sex orgy.

Poland, after attempting to attend the Berkeley City Council meeting of September 22, 1970, was arrested and later convicted of disturbing the peace and interfering with a police officer in the line of duty. He served 90 days at Santa Rita Rehabilitation Center near Dublin.

Psychedelic Venus Church

In 1970, Poland founded the Psychedelic Venus Church (PsyVen or PVC), an offshoot of the Sexual Freedom League, with Mother Boats becoming President.  He felt that the leadership of the Sexual Freedom League was becoming too "bourgeois".  The (entheogenic) sacrament of the Psychedelic Venus Church was marijuana and, after lighting up, at each meeting a woman was chosen to be Venus.  At the beginning of services, she was placed on an altar, candles were lit on each side of her, and her vulva was smeared with honey.  Each of the males (and some women if so inclined) at the meeting licked the woman's vulva in order to honor the goddess Venus. Then the orgy began in earnest. Meetings continued in the San Francisco Bay Area until 1972.

The Church had 700 members by 1971 but disbanded in 1973.

Jefferson Poland Archive

Poland turned over his archives to the Bancroft Library of the University of California, Berkeley, where they are now available for public viewing by academic researchers.

Sex offense, flight, and name change
By 1980, Poland had moved to San Diego.

In 1983, Poland was charged with molesting the 8 or 9 year daughter of an acquaintance whom he babysat. Poland fled the country and he lived for five years as a fugitive in India, Australia, and New Zealand. In 1988, he was arrested in Hawaii. By that time he had changed his last name legally to "Clitlick". He pled no-contest to California Penal Code 288(a), "lewd or lascivious act with a child under 14 years of age," a felony, and was sentenced to a year in prison and to register as a sex offender.

Personal life
Poland moved back to San Francisco in the 1990s and lived near the Civic Center, San Francisco.

Death
His death certificate shows he died as "Jay Poland" on November 17, 2017, at Zuckerberg San Francisco General Hospital located at 1001 Potrero Avenue, San Francisco CA 94118. It says he was widowed but no wife of his is known. His cause of death was sepsis.

Books
 Sex Marchers by Jefferson F. Poland and Sam Sloan (1968)  published by Elysium Growth Press, 2nd Edition (2006)  by Ishi Press
 Second Bite of the Apple, The Bancroft Library, University of California Berkeley, Collection number: BANC MSS 70/143 c
 The Records of the San Francisco Sexual Freedom League by Jefferson F. Poland and Valerie Alison with preface by Herbert Gold, Olympia Press, 1971,

Notes

Cited texts
 paperback 

 
 (reprint)

External links

Jefferson F. Poland papers, approximately 1965-1973
 Photographs from the Jefferson F. Poland papers
Undated letter from Jefferson Poland to Martin Luther King, Jr. 
 MLK's response date November 16, 1962 

1942 births
American sexuality activists
American tax resisters
Free love advocates
American people convicted of child sexual abuse
People from the San Francisco Bay Area
LGBT people from Indiana
People extradited from Australia
People extradited to the United States
American prisoners and detainees
Prisoners and detainees of California
American cannabis activists
2017 deaths